Monzur Hossain (born 1 March 1956) is a Bangladesh Awami League politician and the incumbent Jatiya Sangsad member representing the Faridpur-1 constituency since 2019.

Career
Hossain was elected to parliament from Faridpur-1 as a Bangladesh Awami League candidate 30 December 2018.

References

Living people
1956 births
Awami League politicians
11th Jatiya Sangsad members